Mexedrone (also known as 4-MMC-MeO) is a stimulant and an entactogen drug of the cathinone class that has been sold online as a designer drug. It is the alpha-methoxy derivative of Mephedrone.

Pharmacology 

Mexedrone acts as a weak serotonin–norepinephrine–dopamine reuptake inhibitor (SNDRI) with IC50 values of 5289 nM, 8869 nM and 6844 nM, respectively, as well as a weak serotonin releasing agent (SRA) with an EC50 value of 2525 nM.

Legal status 
Mexedrone is illegal in Sweden as of January 26, 2016 as well as Japan as of August 24, 2016.

See also 
 4-Methylcathinone
 4-Methylbuphedrone
 4-Methylethcathinone
 Zylofuramine

References 

Cathinones
Designer drugs
Serotonin–norepinephrine–dopamine reuptake inhibitors
Serotonin releasing agents